Qualification matches for the 1970 World Men's Handball Championship took place in 1969.

Europe and Africa
The draw took place on 15 March in Basel, Switzerland.

Draw

East Germany – Israel

The second game between East Germany and Israel was a forfeit lose because Israel had not a correct handball hall. This was decided by executive committee of the IHF at the weekend 29–30 November 1969.

In Tel Aviv was only an outdoor small field handball place available and the hall in Kfar Giladi had not the official handball court dimensions of 20×40 meter.

On 28 November 1969 the Israel Handball Association found an alternative place but it was too late.

The Israel Handball Association made a protest against the decision of the IHF. They said the dimensions were correct and on Tuesday two officials of the East Germany team and the two referees had no complains against the field. The Israelis said there were political reasons that the Germany didn't travel to Israel.

On 21 December 1969 the IHF rejected the protest.

Hungary – Bulgaria

Iceland – Austria
List of games form Iceland : 15.11.1969 and 7.12.1969

Norway – Belgium

Poland – Morocco
Morocco gave forfeit. First was Morocco directly qualified for the World championship, one year later the IHF recall this decision.

Soviet Union – Finland

Sweden – Portugal
Portugal gave forfeit

Switzerland – Luxembourg

West Germany – Netherlands

Yugoslavia – Spain

North America
In March Die Tat from Switzerland wrote that Canada and the United States were already qualified.

The USA submitted a protest in December after a research of a private investigator because the Canadian Eric Jacobsen is Danish and has not a passport from Canada. On 21 December 1969 the protest was rejected because of missing evidence by the IHF. In January the USA was able to prove the claimed and Canada was disqualified. Therefore the Spanish team should be the substitute. But they rejected because they have no time to build a good team again. On 28 January 1970 the former rival USA was taken as replacement.

References and notes

World Men's Championship qualification
1970 qualification
Qualification for handball competitions